Joseph Gauthier (March 11, 1877 – June 27, 1934) was a politician Quebec, Canada and a Member of the Legislative Assembly of Quebec (MLA).

Early life

He was born on March 11, 1877, in Montreal, the son of Édouard Gauthier and Célina Richard. He became a typographer and a union activist. Gauthier worked at L'Étendard and then La Patrie. In 1899, he married Mélina Bourgeois.

Political career

He ran as a Labour candidate in the district of Montréal–Sainte-Marie in a by-election held on December 22, 1921, and won. Gauthier was defeated by Conservative candidate Camillien Houde in the 1923 provincial election.

Gauthier defeated Houde and was re-elected as a Liberal in 1927 provincial election. His election was declared void in 1927. Gauthier was not a candidate in the subsequent by-election.

Death

He died on June 27, 1934, in Montreal and was buried in the Notre Dame des Neiges Cemetery.

References

1877 births
1934 deaths
Labour Party (Quebec) MNAs
Politicians from Montreal
Quebec Liberal Party MNAs
Burials at Notre Dame des Neiges Cemetery